An immobilizer is an electronic device fitted to an automobile which prevents the engine from running unless the correct key is present.

Immobilizer may also refer to:

 Immobilizer (chess), a piece used in Baroque chess
 "The Immobilizer", a 1985 television episode
 An alternative name for a medical splint

See also

 Immobile (disambiguation)
 Immobilization (disambiguation)
 Immobilon